Shyambazar refers to a neighbourhood in Kolkata, West Bengal, India.

It also refers to:
 Shyambazar, Hooghly, a village in Goghat II CD block, in Arambagh subdivision of Hooghly district, West Bengal, India